Printworks may refer to:

Printworks (London), a nightclub and events space in Rotherhithe
The Printworks (Manchester), an entertainment venue
Printworks Campus, of the Leeds City College